North Bloomfield Township is one of the sixteen townships of Morrow County, Ohio, United States.  The 2010 census found 1,863 people in the township.

Geography
Located in the northern part of the county, it borders the following townships:
Sandusky Township, Richland County - north
Troy Township, Richland County - northeast corner
Troy Township - east
Perry Township - southeast corner
Congress Township - south
Washington Township - west
Polk Township, Crawford County - northwest

No municipalities are located in North Bloomfield Township, although the unincorporated community of Blooming Grove lies in the northeastern part of the township. Blooming Grove's post office from 1844 until 1912 was named Corsica.

Name and history
North Bloomfield Township was organized in 1817. Bloomfield is a descriptive name for the wildflowers once abundant within its borders. It is the only North Bloomfield Township statewide.

Government
The township is governed by a three-member board of trustees, who are elected in November of odd-numbered years to a four-year term beginning on the following January 1. Two are elected in the year after the presidential election and one is elected in the year before it. There is also an elected township fiscal officer, who serves a four-year term beginning on April 1 of the year after the election, which is held in November of the year before the presidential election. Vacancies in the fiscal officership or on the board of trustees are filled by the remaining trustees.

References

External links
County website

Townships in Morrow County, Ohio
Townships in Ohio
1817 establishments in Ohio
Populated places established in 1817